Al-Haj Mamur Abdul Jabar Shilgari
was elected to represent Ghazni Province in Afghanistan's Wolesi Jirga, the lower house of its National Legislature, in 2005. He belongs to the andar district of Ghazni province. Shilgari is one of the leading politicians and tribal leader from the province. He gained his reputation during the Afghan Jihad against the soviets.
He is a former Mujahedin commander from Gulbuddin Hekmatyar's faction.
He served in the Loya Jirga that drafted Afghanistan's new Constitution.

References

Politicians of Ghazni Province
Living people
Members of the House of the People (Afghanistan)
Year of birth missing (living people)